NA-85 Sargodha-IV is a constituency for the National Assembly of Pakistan.

Members of Parliament

1988—2002: NA-50 Sargodha-IV

2002—2018: NA-67 Sargodha-IV

2018-2022: NA-91 Sargodha-IV

Election 2002 

General elections were held on 10 Oct 2002. Chaudhry Anwar Ali Cheema of PML-Q won by 84,919 votes.

Election 2008 

General elections were held on 18 Feb 2008. Chaudhry Anwar Ali Cheema of PML-Q won by 83,594 votes.

Election 2013 

General elections were held on 11 May 2013. Zulfiqar Ali Bhatti succeeded in the election with 109,132 votes and became a member of the National Assembly.

Election 2018 

General elections were held on 25 July 2018.

Repolling, February 2019 
Following uncovering of evidence of ballot-tempering in an election tribunal, the Election Commission of Pakistan (ECP) ordered a repolling on 20 contentious polling stations at the request of Aamir Sultan Cheema. The repolling was conducted on February 2, 2019, the result of which PTI's Cheema emerged victorious.

Challenge in the Supreme Court 
Bhatti successfully challenged the ECP’s re-polling order in the Supreme Court and he was again declared the winner of this election.

See also
NA-84 Sargodha-III
NA-86 Sargodha-V

References

External links 
Election result's official website

NA-067